Marcel Bon (17 March 1925 – 11 May 2014) was one of France's best known field mycologists. He was born in Picardy in 1925 and came to mycology through general botany, and pharmacology. He lived at Saint-Valery-sur-Somme, a quaint little town on the mouth of the river Somme, in Picardy, Northern France, which was a former artists' and writers' retreat, and is now a popular tourist town.

In 1987, along with two artists (John Wilkinson, and Denys Ovenden) he produced a comprehensive field guide for mycologists, The Mushrooms and Toadstools of Britain and North-western Europe. His other skills were as a pianist, an artist, and a skier.

Bibliography
The Mushrooms and Toadstools of Britain and North Western Europe, Bon M., (1987) pub. Hodder and Stoughton.
 (paperback)
 (hardback).
Les tricholomes de France et d'Europe occidentale, Bon. M, (1984) pub. Lechevalier (Paris).
Fungorum Rariorum Icones Coloratae, Part 15 Corinarius, Bon. M, (1986) pub. Lubrecht & Cramer Ltd.
Collins Pocket Guide; Mushrooms and Toadstools of Britain and North-Western Europe (Paperback), (2004) pub. HarperCollins Canada.

See also
List of mycologists

References

External links
Mushrooms and Toadstools of Britain and North-West Europe

1925 births
French mycologists
2014 deaths